In set theory, the singular cardinals hypothesis (SCH) arose from the question of whether the least cardinal number for which the generalized continuum hypothesis (GCH) might fail could be a singular cardinal.

According to Mitchell (1992), the singular cardinals hypothesis is:
If κ is any singular strong limit cardinal, then 2κ = κ+.
Here, κ+ denotes the successor cardinal of κ.

Since SCH is a consequence of GCH, which is known to be consistent with ZFC, SCH is consistent with ZFC.  The negation of SCH has also been shown to be consistent with ZFC, if one assumes the existence of a sufficiently large cardinal number.  In fact, by results of Moti Gitik, ZFC + the negation of SCH is equiconsistent with ZFC + the existence of a measurable cardinal κ of Mitchell order κ++.

Another form of the SCH is the following statement:
2cf(κ) < κ implies κcf(κ) = κ+,
where cf denotes the cofinality function.  Note that κcf(κ)= 2κ  for all singular strong limit cardinals κ. The second formulation of SCH is strictly stronger than the first version, since the first one only mentions strong limits. From a model in which the first version of SCH fails at ℵω and GCH holds above ℵω+2, we can construct a model in which the first version of SCH holds but the second version of SCH fails, by adding ℵω Cohen subsets to ℵn for some n.

Jack Silver proved that if κ is singular with uncountable cofinality and 2λ = λ+ for all infinite cardinals λ < κ, then 2κ = κ+. Silver's original proof used generic ultrapowers.  The following important fact follows from Silver's theorem:  if the singular cardinals hypothesis holds for all singular cardinals of countable cofinality, then it holds for all singular cardinals.  In particular, then, if  is the least counterexample to the singular cardinals hypothesis, then .

The negation of the singular cardinals hypothesis is intimately related to violating the GCH at a measurable cardinal. A well-known result of Dana Scott is that if the GCH holds below a measurable cardinal  on a set of measure one—i.e., there is normal -complete ultrafilter D on  such that , then . Gitik, building on work of Woodin, was able to replace the supercompact in Silver's proof with measurable of Mitchell order . That established an upper bound for the consistency strength of the failure of the SCH. Gitik again, using results of inner model theory, was able to show that a measurable cardinal of Mitchell order  is also the lower bound for the consistency strength of the failure of SCH.

A wide variety of propositions imply SCH.  As was noted above, GCH implies SCH.  On the other hand, the proper forcing axiom, which implies  and hence is incompatible with GCH also implies SCH.  Solovay showed that large cardinals almost imply SCH—in particular, if  is strongly compact cardinal, then the SCH holds above .  On the other hand, the non-existence of (inner models for) various large cardinals (below a measurable cardinal of Mitchell order ) also imply SCH.

References
 Thomas Jech: Properties of the gimel function and a classification of singular cardinals, Fundamenta Mathematicae 81 (1974): 57-64. 
 William J. Mitchell, "On the singular cardinal hypothesis," Trans. Amer. Math. Soc., volume 329 (2): pp. 507–530, 1992.
 Jason Aubrey, The Singular Cardinals Problem (PDF), VIGRE expository report, Department of Mathematics, University of Michigan.

Cardinal numbers